The Corinium Museum, in the Cotswold town of Cirencester in England, has a large collection of objects found in and around the locality. The bulk of the exhibits are from the Roman town of Corinium Dobunnorum, but the museum includes material from as early as the Neolithic and all the way up to Victorian times.

The museum has a collection of 2nd- and 4th-century Roman mosaic floors and carvings, as well other Roman objects, large and small.

The building, which was built in the mid 18th century, was previously a house. It is a Grade II listed building

References

External links
 Corinium Museum

Museums established in 1938
Archaeological museums in England
Grade II* listed buildings in Gloucestershire
Museums in Gloucestershire
Museums of ancient Rome in the United Kingdom
Cirencester